Pioneers Who Got Scalped: The Anthology is a compilation album by the American new wave band Devo, released in 2000 by Rhino Records. 17 of the 50 tracks were previously unreleased on CD, including single B-sides, outtakes, remixes, soundtrack songs and spoken word material. The band recorded the long-time concert favorite "The Words Get Stuck in My Throat" (from the film The War of the Gargantuas) in the studio for the first time, specifically for inclusion on this compilation.

The liner notes are by music historian Andy Zax, most famous for being the "Music Geek" on the Comedy Central program Beat the Geeks.

The title is a reference to the band's opinion that at the start of their career they were critically roasted for originating approaches that soon became common practice.

Cover artwork
The original Rhino package used lenticular printing to create "animated" front and back covers. The front cover animation showed tomahawks flying towards the band members who are tied to stakes, causing their energy dome hats to fly off their heads. The back cover shows the animated music executives, who were actual Rhino employees, throwing the tomahawks. The employees pictured, from front to back, are David Dorn (from, at the time, the Publicity Department), Arny Schorr (from Rhino Home Video), Mark Pinkus (from Special Markets), Bill Smith (from Radio Promotion) and Bob O'Neill (from Business Affairs).

Track listing
Adapted from the album's liner notes. Asterisks denote songs previously unavailable on CD.

Personnel

All credits adapted from the album's liner notes.
Devo
Mark Mothersbaugh – vocals, keyboards, guitar, voice (as Booji Boy) on "We're All Devo!" and "The Words Get Stuck in My Throat"
Gerald Casale – vocals, bass guitar, keyboards
Bob Mothersbaugh – lead guitar, vocals
Bob Casale – rhythm guitar, keyboards, vocals
Jim Mothersbaugh – drums (1974–1976)
Alan Myers – drums (1976–1986)
David Kendrick – drums (1986–1990), bongos on "Communication Break-up"
Josh Freese – drums (1995–)

Additional musicians
Robert L. Mothersbaugh – voice (as General Boy) on "We're All Devo!", "General Boy Visits Apocalypse Now" and "Duty Now for the Future!"
Annerose Bücklers – voice (as nurse) on "Theme from Doctor Detroit"
Roli Rox – additional programming on "Here to Go"
Steve Lindsay – bass sample on "Disco Dancer"
Paul C. – additional programming on "Disco Dancer"
Bob Lee – drums on "Head Like a Hole"
Nick Vincent – drums on "Thanks to You"
Ralf Rickert – trumpet on "Communication Break-up"
Larry Klimas – saxophone on "Communication Break-up"
Paul Morin – stand-up bass on "Communication Break-up"

Technical
Devo – producer (disc one: 2, 3, 14–26 / disc 2: 1, 5–16, 18–22, 24), engineer (disc one: 2, 3 / disc 2: 6), compilation producer
Brian Eno – producer (disc one: 4–8)
Ken Scott – producer, engineer (disc one: 9–13)
Robert Margouleff – producer, engineer (disc one: 15–20)
Roy Thomas Baker – producer (disc two: 2–4)
Bob Casale – producer (disc two: 17), engineer (disc two: 5, 7–22, 24), mixing (disc two: 20)
Gerald Casale – producer, engineer (disc two: 17)
Conny Plank – engineer (disc one: 4–8)
Patrick Gleeson – engineer (disc one: 8)
Brian Leshon – assistant engineer (disc one: 9–13)
Phil Jost – assistant engineer (disc one: 9–13)
Buck Herring – engineer (disc one: 14)
Wally Duguid – engineer (disc one: 14)
Howard Siegal – engineer (disc one: 15–20)
Karat Faye – assistant engineer (disc one: 15–20, 22, 23, 25)
Ian Taylor – remix (disc one: 19)
Michael Boshears – engineer (disc one: 21)
Larry Alexander – engineer (disc one: 22, 23, 25)
Phil Brown – engineer (disc one: 24)
Gordon Fordyce – engineer (disc two: 2–4)
Stuart Graham – assistant engineer (disc two: 2–4)
Ed Delena – assistant engineer (disc two: 7–9, 12)
Mike Shipley – mixing (disc two: 7)
Ivan Ivan – remix (disc two: 8, 15)
Steve Peck – remix engineer (disc two: 8)
Clive Taylor – assistant engineer (disc two: 11)
Ted Pattison – assistant engineer (disc two: 14–16)
Roey Shamir – remix engineer (disc two: 15)
Roger Pauletta – editing (disc two: 15)
Biff Dawes – live engineer (disc two: 17)
Andrew Ballard – assistant engineer (disc two: 18, 19)
Jeff Lord-Alge – mixing (disc two: 18, 19)
Bill Inglot – remastering, compilation sound producer
Dan Hersch – remastering
Gary Peterson – compilation producer
David McLees – compilation producer
David Baker – compilation producer
Josh Mancell – compilation assistance, tape research
Hugh Brown – art direction, design
Rachel Gutek – design

References

Devo compilation albums
2000 compilation albums
Warner Records compilation albums